The 2017 Indiana Hoosiers baseball team is a baseball team that represented Indiana University in the 2017 NCAA Division I baseball season. The Hoosiers are members of the Big Ten Conference and played their home games at Bart Kaufman Field in Bloomington, Indiana. They were led by third-year head coach Chris Lemonis.

Following the conclusion of the regular season, the Hoosiers were selected to play in the 2017 NCAA Tournament, beginning in the Lexington Regional. The Hoosiers would eventually lose in the second round of the Lexington Regional to Kentucky by a score of 9–14. Two players from the team (Craig Dedelow and Luke Miller) were selected in the MLB Draft.

Previous season
The Hoosiers finished the 2016 NCAA Division I baseball season 32–24 overall (15–9 conference) and fourth place in conference standings. The Hoosiers would lose in the second round of the 2016 Big Ten Conference baseball tournament to Maryland, 3–0. Indiana would not be selected to play in the 2016 NCAA Division I baseball tournament.

MLB Draft 
The following Hoosiers on the 2016 roster were selected in the 2016 Major League Baseball draft:

* indicates draftee had no more college eligibility

Preseason
On August 22, 2016, head coach Lemonis promoted pitching coach Kyle Bunn to Associate Head Coach. On December 12, 2016, Lemonis named senior infielder Tony Butler and senior right-handed pitcher Luke Stephenson to Captain status for the 2017 year. On January 19, 2017, the Big Ten Conference announced that the 2017 Big Ten baseball tournament will be held at Bart Kaufman Field.

Roster

Schedule

! style="" | Regular season
|- valign="top" 

|- bgcolor="#ffcccc"
| 1 || February 17 || vs #5 Oregon State || Surprise Stadium • Surprise, Arizona || 0–1 || 0–1 || –
|- bgcolor="#ccffcc"
| 2 || February 18 || vs  || Surprise Stadium • Surprise, Arizona || 12–3 || 1–1 || –
|- bgcolor="#ccffcc"
| 3 || February 18 || vs Gonzaga || Surprise Stadium • Surprise, Arizona || 5–1 || 2–1 || –
|- bgcolor="#ffcccc"
| 4 || February 19 || vs #5 Oregon State || Surprise Stadium • Surprise, Arizona || 1–4 || 2–2 || –
|- bgcolor="#ccffcc"
| 5 || February 24 || at  || FAU Baseball Stadium • Boca Raton, Florida, || 8–4 || 3–2 || –
|- bgcolor="#ffcccc"
| 6 || February 25 || at Florida Atlantic|| FAU Baseball Stadium • Boca Raton, Florida || 2–6 || 3–3 || –
|- bgcolor="#FFFFE0"
| 7 || February 26 || at Florida Atlantic|| FAU Baseball Stadium • Boca Raton, Florida || 6–6 || 3–3–1 || –
|-

|- bgcolor="#ffcccc"
| 8 || March 1 || at  || Marge Schott Stadium • Cincinnati, Ohio, || 1–6 || 3–4–1 || –
|- bgcolor="#ccffcc"
| 9 || March 3 || at  || Joe Lee Griffin Stadium • Birmingham, Alabama || 10–5 || 4–4–1 || –
|- bgcolor="#ffcccc"
| 10 || March 4 || at Samford || Joe Lee Griffin Stadium • Birmingham, Alabama || 5–6 || 4–5–1 || –
|- bgcolor="#ffcccc"
| 11 || March 5 || at Samford || Joe Lee Griffin Stadium • Birmingham, Alabama || 3–5 || 4–6–1 || –
|- bgcolor="#bbbbbb"
| 12 || March 7 || at  || Charles H. Braun Stadium • Evansville, Indiana || Cancelled || 4–6–1 || –
|- bgcolor="#ffcccc"
| 13 || March 10 ||  || Bart Kaufman Field • Bloomington, Indiana || 3–5|| 4–7–1 || –
|- bgcolor="#ccffcc"
| 14 || March 11 || Middle Tennessee || Bart Kaufman Field • Bloomington, Indiana || 12–1 || 5–7–1 || –
|- bgcolor="#ccffcc"
| 15 || March 12 || Middle Tennessee || Bart Kaufman Field • Bloomington, Indiana || 6–0|| 6–7–1 || –
|- bgcolor="#ccffcc"
| 16 || March 15 || at  || Les Murakami Stadium • Honolulu, Hawaii || 7–6 || 7–7–1 || –
|- bgcolor="#ccffcc"
| 17 || March 16 || at Hawaii || Les Murakami Stadium • Honolulu, Hawaii || 4–3 || 8–7–1 || –
|- bgcolor="#ccffcc"
| 18 || March 17 || at Hawaii || Les Murakami Stadium • Honolulu, Hawaii || 8–5 || 9–7–1 || –
|- bgcolor="#ffcccc"
| 19 || March 18 || at Hawaii || Les Murakami Stadium • Honolulu, Hawaii || 10–11 || 9–8–1 || –
|- bgcolor="#ccffcc"
| 20 || March 22 || Cincinnati || Bart Kaufman Field • Bloomington, Indiana || 3–2 || 10–8–1 || –
|- bgcolor="#ccffcc"
| 21 || March 24 || at  || Rocky Miller Park • Evanston, Illinois, || 13–9 || 11–8–1 || 1–0
|- bgcolor="#ccffcc"
| 22 || March 25 || at Northwestern || Rocky Miller Park • Evanston, Illinois || 6–5 || 12–8–1 || 2–0
|- bgcolor="#ccffcc"
| 23 || March 26 || at Northwestern || Rocky Miller Park • Evanston, Illinois || 10–9 || 13–8–1 || 3–0
|- bgcolor="#ccffcc"
| 24 || March 28 || Evansville || Bart Kaufman Field • Bloomington, Indiana || 6–3 || 14–8–1 || 3–0
|- bgcolor="#ffcccc"
| 25 || March 29 ||  || Bart Kaufman Field • Bloomington, Indiana || 3–7 || 14–9–1 || 3–0
|- bgcolor="#ffcccc"
| 25 || March 31 ||  || Bart Kaufman Field • Bloomington, Indiana || 3–7 || 14–10–1 || 3–1
|-

|- bgcolor="#ffcccc"
| 26 || April 1 || Nebraska|| Bart Kaufman Field • Bloomington, Indiana || 1–3 || 14–11–1 || 3–2 
|- bgcolor="#FFFFE0"
| 27 || April 2 || Nebraska || Bart Kaufman Field • Bloomington, Indiana || 1–1 || 14–11–2 || 3–2–1
|- bgcolor="#ccffcc"
| 28 || April 4 ||  || Bart Kaufman Field • Bloomington, Indiana || 3–2 || 15–11–2 || 3–2–1
|- bgcolor="#ffcccc"
| 29 || April 7 || at Purdue || Alexander Field • West Lafayette, Indiana || 5–6 || 15–12–2 || 3–3–1
|- bgcolor="#ffcccc"
| 30 || April 8 || at Purdue || Alexander Field • West Lafayette, Indiana || 3–7 || 15–13–2 || 3–4–1
|- bgcolor="#ccffcc"
| 31 || April 9 || at Purdue || Alexander Field • West Lafayette, Indiana || 14–9 || 16–13–2 || 4–4–1
|- bgcolor="#ccffcc"
| 32 || April 11 || at Indiana State || Bob Warn Field at Sycamore Stadium • Terre Haute, Indiana || 2–0 || 17–13–2 || 4–4–1
|- bgcolor="#ffcccc"
| 33 || April 14 ||  || Bart Kaufman Field • Bloomington, Indiana || 0–11 || 17–14–2 || 4–5–1
|- bgcolor="#ccffcc"
| 34 || April 15 || Minnesota || Bart Kaufman Field • Bloomington, Indiana || 13–12 || 18–14–2 || 5–5–1
|- bgcolor="#ccffcc"
| 35 || April 16 || Minnesota || Bart Kaufman Field • Bloomington, Indiana || 4–0 || 19–14–2 || 6–5–1
|- bgcolor="#ffcccc"
| 36 || April 19 ||  || Bart Kaufman Field • Bloomington, Indiana || 5–7 || 19–15–2 || 6–5–1
|- bgcolor="#ccffcc"
| 37 || April 21 ||  || Ray Fisher Stadium • Ann Arbor, Michigan, || 1–0 || 20–15–2 || 7–5–1
|- bgcolor="#ccffcc"
| 38 || April 22 || Michigan || Ray Fisher Stadium • Ann Arbor, Michigan || 12–9 || 21–15–2 || 8–5–1
|- bgcolor="#ffcccc"
| 39 || April 23 || Michigan || Ray Fisher Stadium • Ann Arbor, Michigan || 5–12 || 21–16–2 || 8–6–1
|- bgcolor="#ccffcc"
| 40 || April 25 || vs Ball State || Victory Field • Indianapolis, Indiana || 4–3 || 22–16–2 || 8–6–1
|- bgcolor="#ccffcc"
| 41 || April 28 ||  || Bart Kaufman Field • Bloomington, Indiana || 9–2 || 23–16–2 || 9–6–1
|- bgcolor="#ffcccc"
| 42 || April 29 || Maryland || Bart Kaufman Field • Bloomington, Indiana || 2–9 || 23–17–2 || 9–7–1
|- bgcolor="#ccffcc"
| 43 || April 30 || Maryland || Bart Kaufman Field • Bloomington, Indiana || 6–3 || 24–17–2 || 10–7–1
|-

|- bgcolor="#ccffcc"
| 44 || May 5 ||  || Bart Kaufman Field • Bloomington, Indiana || 1–0 || 25–17–2 || 10–7–1
|- bgcolor="#ccffcc"
| 45 || May 6 || Xavier || Bart Kaufman Field • Bloomington, Indiana || 14–3 || 26–17–2 || 10–7–1
|- bgcolor="#ccffcc"
| 46 || May 7 || Xavier || Bart Kaufman Field • Bloomington, Indiana || 11–7 || 27–17–2 || 10–7–1
|- bgcolor="#ffcccc"
| 47 || May 9 || at Kentucky || Cliff Hagan Stadium • Lexington, Kentucky, || 2–5 || 27–18–2 || 10–7–1
|- bgcolor="#ffcccc"
| 48 || May 12 ||  || Bart Kaufman Field • Bloomington, Indiana || 2–5 || 27–19–2 || 10–8–1
|- bgcolor="#ccffcc"
| 49 || May 13 || Penn State || Bart Kaufman Field • Bloomington, Indiana || 5–2 || 28–19–2 || 11–8–1
|- bgcolor="#ccffcc"
| 50 || May 14 || Penn State || Bart Kaufman Field • Bloomington, Indiana || 10–2 || 29–19–2 || 12–8–1
|- bgcolor="#ccffcc"
| 51 || May 16 || Louisville || Bart Kaufman Field • Bloomington, Indiana || 4–3 || 30–19–2 || 12–8–1
|- bgcolor="#ffcccc"
| 52 || May 18 || at  || Bill Davis Stadium • Columbus, Ohio, || 4–7 || 30–20–2 || 12–9–1
|- bgcolor="#ccffcc"
| 53 || May 19 || at Ohio State || Bill Davis Stadium • Columbus, Ohio || 8–4|| 31–20–2 || 13–9–1
|- bgcolor="#ccffcc"
| 54 || May 20 || at Ohio State || Bill Davis Stadium • Columbus, Ohio || 4–3|| 32–20–2 || 14–9–1
|-

|-
! style="" | Post-Season
|- 

|- bgcolor="#ffcccc"
| 55 || May 24 ||  || Bart Kaufman Field • Bloomington, Indiana || 4–5 || 32–21–2 || 14–9–1
|- bgcolor="#ccffcc"
| 56 || May 25 ||  || Bart Kaufman Field • Bloomington, Indiana || 5–4(13) || 33–21–2 || 14–9–1
|- bgcolor="#ffcccc"
| 57 || May 26 || Minnesota || Bart Kaufman Field • Bloomington, Indiana || 8–9 || 33–22–2 || 14–9–1
|-

|- bgcolor="#ffcccc"
| 58 || June 2 ||  || Cliff Hagan Stadium • Lexington, Kentucky, || 6–7 || 33–23–2 || 14–9–1
|- bgcolor="#ccffcc"
| 59 || June 3 ||  || Cliff Hagan Stadium • Lexington, Kentucky, || 11–2 || 34–23–2 || 14–9–1
|- bgcolor="#ffcccc"
| 60 || June 4 || Kentucky || Cliff Hagan Stadium • Lexington, Kentucky, || 9–14 || 34–24–2 || 14–9–1
|-

|

Lexington Regional 

 Lexington Regional Scores Source

Awards and honors

Regular season awards

Conference awards

See also
 2017 Big Ten Conference baseball tournament
 2017 NCAA Division I baseball tournament

References

Indiana
Indiana Hoosiers baseball seasons
2017 in sports in Indiana
Indiana Hoosiers